Antonio Dwight Beckham (born October 1, 1978) is a former American football cornerback. He was drafted by the Tennessee Titans in the fourth round  of the 2002 NFL Draft. He played college football at Wisconsin–Stout.

Beckham also played for the Detroit Lions.

Personal life
On January 14, 2019, Beckham found a 48-year-old man outside his house allegedly looking into his daughter's window with a hand down his pants. Beckham then chased the man down, tackled him, and held the alleged "peeping tom" until police arrived.

References

External links
 Detroit Lions bio
 Peeping Tom Incident

1978 births
Living people
Ocala High School alumni
American football cornerbacks
Detroit Lions players
Tennessee Titans players
Wisconsin–Stout Blue Devils football players
Players of American football from Gainesville, Florida